Angela Batinovich is an American businesswoman, notable for being the youngest owner of a professional U.S. sports team.  She is the creator of "Bat's Daughter", a line of women's clothing. Her father, Robert Batinovich, is a successful real estate investor and manager. She attended Notre Dame High School which is located in Belmont, California. She earned a degree from Loyola Marymount University in Los Angeles.

From 2005-2009, she was the majority shareholder and managing partner of the Portland LumberJax franchise of the National Lacrosse League. The LumberJax were successful on the floor, reaching the playoffs in three of the four seasons including a trip to the Championship game in 2008, but failed to draw sufficient crowds in Portland. The team folded after the 2009 season.

Batinovich, at 24 years old, was the youngest owner in major professional sports. On May 8, 2006, she was named the NLL Executive of the Year.

Personal life
On December 23, 2006, Batinovich announced her engagement to LumberJax player Adam Bysouth. On July 28, 2007, the two were married in Hillsborough, CA.  Among the people in attendance were Portland goaltender Dallas Eliuk and NLL Commissioner Jim Jennings.

References

American sports businesspeople
National Lacrosse League
National Lacrosse League major award winners
Living people
Portland LumberJax
21st-century American businesspeople
21st-century American businesswomen
Year of birth missing (living people)